Churchill Community College is a mixed secondary school in Wallsend, Tyne and Wear, England. The College teaches students between the ages of 11-18 and is registered to provide SCITT training.

Ofsted Status
In 2014, The College obtained "outstanding" status in all areas by Ofsted.
Churchill Community College was also rated "one of the best in country", with only 11% of secondary schools in the United Kingdom to achieve this status.
In 2019 the schools status was lowered to "good" following a drop in student results and a less effective use of funding.

Sixth form
Churchill Community College and Burnside Business and Enterprise College Sixth Forms have a strong tradition of collaboration.

School-Centred Initial Teacher Training (SCITT)
The College is a provider of SCITT training for PGCE students.

PALS

Personal Achievement through Learning Support
PALS was created to target Key Stage 4 students, offering:
Full-time supervised, statutory education for pupils coming into borough and without a mainstream school.
Full/part-time supervised, statutory education for pupils referred by the North Tyneside Secondary Education Improvement Partnership (EIP) of schools via the Secondary Support Team (SST).

The aim of PALS is to "To maximise attainment and progress of mainstream pupils at serious risk of permanent exclusion or who are without a school place."

Ofsted report for PALS
 PALS 2013 Ofsted Report

Notable former pupils

Callum Roberts, footballer

Churchill Family of Schools
Comprises Churchill Community College and the 5 primary schools in its locality:
Battle Hill Primary School
Denbigh Community Primary School
Hadrian Park Primary School
Holy Cross R C Primary School
Stephenson Memorial Primary School

References

External links
Churchill Community College Website

Secondary schools in the Metropolitan Borough of North Tyneside
Educational institutions established in 1960
1960 establishments in England
Wallsend
Foundation schools in the Metropolitan Borough of North Tyneside